Sphenomorphus yersini, Yersin’s forest skink, is a species of skink found in Vietnam.

References

yersini
Reptiles described in 2018
Reptiles of Vietnam